The following highways are numbered 909:

Costa Rica
 National Route 909

United States